František Smotlacha (born 30 January 1884 in Hradec Králové - died 18 June 1956 in Prague) was a Czech mycologist. He founded the Czechoslovak Mycological Society in 1921 together with Rudolf Veselý and the leading journal of Czech mycology: Mykologický sborník - Časopis Českých Houbařů (known as the C.C.H. among mycologists) in 1919. He was also president of the Czechoslovak Jiujitsu Union and founder of collegiate sport in Czechoslovakia. His son, Miroslav Smotlacha, also became a mycologist.

Smotlacha described many species of fungi including
 Boletus rhodopurpureus
 Morchella pragensis
 Boletus fuscoroseus

He also wrote many books about fungi, both scientific and popular: his greatest success was Atlas hub jedlých a nejedlých; mycologia practica (14 editions 1947–1952) that described 78 "edible and non edible" mushrooms (with color photos).

References

Bibliography
Herink J. (1957): "In memoriam: Dr. František Smotlacha (1888-1956)".   Česká Mykologie 11(2): 65–66. (In Czech)

1884 births
1956 deaths
Czech mycologists
Scientists from Hradec Králové
Czechoslovak mycologists